Gremyachye is a rural locality (a selo) and the administrative center of Pavlovskoye Rural Settlement, Ramonsky District, Voronezh Oblast, Russia. The population was 235 as of 2010. There are 5 streets.

Geography 
Gremyachye is located on the Bolshaya Vereyka River, 48 km northwest of Ramon (the district's administrative centre) by road. Lebyazhye is the nearest rural locality.

References 

Rural localities in Ramonsky District